The Sputnik rocket was an uncrewed orbital carrier rocket designed by Sergei Korolev in the Soviet Union, derived from the R-7 Semyorka ICBM. On 4 October 1957, it was used to perform the world's first satellite launch, placing Sputnik 1 into a low Earth orbit.

Two versions of the Sputnik were built, the Sputnik-PS (GRAU index 8K71PS), which was used to launch Sputnik 1 and later Sputnik 2, and the Sputnik (8A91), which failed to launch a satellite in April 1958, and subsequently launched Sputnik 3 on 15 May 1958.

A later member of the R-7 family, the Polyot, used the same configuration as the Sputnik rocket, but was constructed from Voskhod components. Because of the similarity, the Polyot was sometimes known as the Sputnik 11A59.

Specifications

First Stage: Block B, V, G, D (four strap-on boosters)
Gross mass: 43.0 tons
Empty mass: 3.400 tons
Thrust (vac): 4 × 99,000 kgf = 396 Mgf (3.89 MN)
Isp: 306 s (3,000 N·s/kg)
Burn time: 120 s (2 min)
Isp (sl): 250 s (2,450 N·s/kg)
Diameter: 
Span: 
Length:  (without nozzles)
Propellants: LOX/Kerosene
Engines: 1 x RD-107-8D74PS per booster = 4
Second Stage: Block A (core stage)
Gross mass: 94.0 tons
Empty mass: 7.495 tons
Thrust (vac): 99,000 kgf (970 kN)
Isp: 308 s (3,020 N·s/kg)
Burn time: 310 s (5 min 10 s)
Isp(sl): 241 s (2,360 N·s/kg)
Diameter: 
Span: 
Length: 
Propellants: LOX/Kerosene
Engine: 1 x RD-108-8D75PS
Total mass: 267 tons (534,000 lb)
Total span: 
LEO payload: 500 kg
Total liftoff thrust:  3.89 MN

Sputnik 8A91 
The Sputnik 8A91 had more powerful 8D76 and 8D77 engines installed, increasing its payload capacity, and allowing it to launch much heavier satellites than Sputnik 1 and Sputnik 2. It was launched two times, in 1958. The first launch, on 27 April, failed due to vibrations that unexpectedly occurred during the flight along the longitudinal axis of the rocket. On 15 May, it successfully launched Sputnik 3.

Sputnik specifications
Stage number: 0 - Strap-on boosters; 4 x Sputnik 8A91-0
Gross mass: 43.0 tons
Empty mass: 3.400 tons
Thrust (vac): 4 × 99,000 kgf = 396 Mgf (3.89 MN)
Isp: 310 s (3,040 N·s/kg)
Burn time: 130 s (2 min 10 s)
Isp(sl): 252 s (2,470 N·s/kg)
Diameter: 
Span: 
Length:  (without nozzles)
Propellants: Lox/Kerosene
Engines: 1 x RD-107-8D76 per booster = 4
Stage number: 1 - Core stage; 1 x Sputnik 8A91-1
Gross mass: 95.0 tons
Empty mass: 7.100 tons
Thrust (vac): 82,000 kgf (804 kN)
Isp: 315 s (3,090 N·s/kg)
Burn time: 360 s (6 min)
Isp(sl): 246 s (2,410 N·s/kg)
Diameter: 
Length:
Propellants: LOX/Kerosene
Engine: 1 x RD-108-8D77
Total mass: 269.3 tons
Total span: 
LEO payload: 1,327 kg (2,925 lb)
Total liftoff thrust:  385,950 kgf (3.784 MN, 850,870 lbf)

References 

R-7 (rocket family)
Space launch vehicles of the Soviet Union
Sputnik
Vehicles introduced in 1957
1950s neologisms